Samantha Jane Robson (born  22 March 1966 in Wandsworth, London) is an English actress best known for playing WPC Vicky Hagen in The Bill from 1998 to 2001.

In 1993 she made her TV debut in Red Dwarf as Pete Tranter's sister in the episode "Psirens". In 2002 she appeared in the crime drama series Murder in Mind.

Toonami fans know her as the possible voice actress of Sara 2.

References

External links

 Official website 

1966 births
English television actresses
Living people
Royal Shakespeare Company members
English stage actresses
20th-century English actresses
21st-century English actresses
People from the London Borough of Wandsworth
Actresses from London